The Private Afternoons of Pamela Mann is a 1974 American hardcore adult film starring Barbara Bourbon and directed by Radley Metzger (as "Henry Paris") that is considered one of the classics of the Golden Age of Porn (1969–1984). It was a step forward in the development of the genre, as it had a plot and good acting. The movie can be seen as a meditation on voyeurism, due to the trope of Mann being spied on by a private detective hired by her husband, and the production of pornography itself, as the detective films her sexual encounters.

Porn film star Bill Margold, who went on to be the director of the Free Speech Coalition, has written that "The Private Afternoons of Pamela Mann signals an end to the all-balling, no purpose, disposable mastur-movies that go into one orifice and out another.” Filmed in Manhattan, the movie was released in New York City on December 26, 1974 and was nationally distributed in 1975. The film has been inducted into the XRCO Hall of Fame.

Plot
Bourbon plays Pamela Mann, a married psychotherapist living and working in Manhattan who has several sexual encounters that are filmed by a private detective hired by her husband. Mann has sex with one of her patients, a prostitute, and also is kidnapped by a couple of radicals. While the male radical orally rapes Mann, the female radical reads the text of a Supreme Court decision on pornography. She also fellates a man she meets on a park bench. At the climax of the film, Mann is revealed to be watching the detective's films in bed with her husband. They have staged the encounters and the snooping for their own private enjoyment. They then have sex.

Cast

 Barbara Bourbon as Pamela Mann
 Sonny Landham as Political Candidate
 Darby Lloyd Rains as Rapist
 Marc Stevens as First Man with Pamela
 Eric Edwards as Frank
 Kevin Andre as Frank's First Client
 Day Jason (as Naomi Jason) as Receptionist
 Alan Marlow as Pamela's Husband
 Jamie Gillis (as Jamey Gills) as Rapist
 Doris Toumarkine (as Lola LaGarce) as Poll Taker
 Levi Richards (as John Ashton) as Hiram Wood
 Georgina Spelvin as Hooker

Notes
The Private Afternoons of Pamela Manns was released  during the Golden Age of Porn (inaugurated by the 1969 release of Andy Warhol Blue Movie) in the United States, at a time of "porno chic", in which adult erotic films were just beginning to be widely released, publicly discussed by celebrities (like Johnny Carson and Bob Hope) and taken seriously by film critics (like Roger Ebert).

According to one film reviewer, Radley Metzger's films, including those made during the Golden Age of Porn (1969–1984), are noted for their "lavish design, witty screenplays, and a penchant for the unusual camera angle". Another reviewer noted that his films were "highly artistic — and often cerebral ... and often featured gorgeous cinematography". Film and audio works by Metzger have been added to the permanent collection of the Museum of Modern Art (MoMA) in New York City.

Remastered version
In 2011, DistribPix released a complete remastering of the film, with the full cooperation of the director. The result had a limited exhibition in theaters, but the main outcome of the project was the first-ever official remastered DVD version. A listing of the music on the film soundtrack was released earlier.

See also

 Andy Warhol filmography
 Erotic art
 Erotic films in the United States
 Erotic photography
 Golden Age of Porn
 List of American films of 1974
 Sex in film
 Unsimulated sex

References

Further reading
 
 Heffernan, Kevin, "A social poetics of pornography", Quarterly Review of Film and Video, Volume 15, Issue 3, December 1994, pp. 77–83. .
 Lehman, Peter, Pornography: film and culture, Rutgers depth of field series, Rutgers University Press, 2006, .
 Williams, Linda, Hard core: power, pleasure, and the "frenzy of the visible", University of California Press, 1999, .

External links
 The Private Afternoons of Pamela Mann at  MUBI (related to The Criterion Collection)
 
 
 The Private Afternoons of Pamela Mann on the Amazon WebSite.
 The Private Afternoons of Pamela Mann – review/RockShockPop.
 The Private Afternoons of Pamela Mann – review/10kBullets.
 The Private Afternoons of Pamela Mann – 2011 remastering at DistribPix.
 The Private Afternoons of Pamela Mann - Trailer (02:55).

American pornographic films
1970s English-language films
Films about psychiatry
Films directed by Radley Metzger
1974 films
1970s pornographic films
1970s American films